Keale is a surname. Notable people with the surname include: 

Bill Keale, American singer-songwriter
Moe Keale (1939–2002), American musician and actor

See also
Heale
Keane (surname)